Devick Lake is a lake near Heffley Creek, British Columbia.

History
It is named for Henri Louis Devick who came from Switzerland in 1904 to settle west of Heffley Creek, British Columbia. It is the source of Devick Creek.

References

Lakes of British Columbia
Thompson Country
Kamloops Division Yale Land District